Let the Record Play is the fifth studio album by American alt-rock group Moon Taxi. It was released on January 19, 2018, and was the band's first with RCA Records.

Background and release 
On May 5, 2017, Moon Taxi released a single, "Two High". On November 17, 2017, Taxi and RCA Records announced that the band's fifth album, entitled Let the Record Play, would be released January 19, 2018. An eponymous single was released with the album announcement. The news came a little bit more than two months after RCA had signed the band. Moon Taxi lead vocalist Trevor Terndrup later said that the album had been finished before the deal with RCA came about. "Good As Gold" was released as the third single off the album on December 8, 2017, and "Not Too Late" was released as the fourth single off the album a week before the album's release. Two High and Not Too Late both charted on the Adult Alternative Songs chart, with the former peaking at third position and the latter peaking at position 22.

Track listing

Charts

References 

2018 albums
RCA Records albums